Figo or FIGO may refer to:

Luís Figo (born 1972), retired Portuguese footballer
Figo (footballer) (born 1986), Cape Verdean footballer, legal name Osvaldo Tavares Oliveira
the original form of the Italian family name Piccio
International Federation of Gynecology and Obstetrics, a non-governmental organisation (Federation Internationale de Gynecologie et d'Obstetrique)
FIGO classification of ovarian cancer
FIGO classification of uterine bleeding
Ponta Figo, São Tomé and Príncipe, a village in São Tomé Island
Michelia figo, an evergreen tree
Ford Figo, a car manufactured by Ford

See also 
 Figa (disambiguation)
 Vigo (disambiguation)